Frederick "Fred" Jones is a fictional character in the American animated series Scooby-Doo, leader of a quartet of teenage mystery solvers and their Great Dane companion, Scooby-Doo. Fred has been primarily portrayed by voice actor Frank Welker since the character's inception in 1969.

Character description
In most series, Fred wears a white and/or blue shirt and blue pants. In the original series, Fred wears an orange Hermès ascot tie with a blue shirt and white sweater. In the 1990s direct-to-video films, Fred generally wears a light blue shirt. In the 2002 series What's New, Scooby-Doo?, Fred's outfit was given an update, with his orange ascot being replaced with a blue stripe. He is often shown constructing various Rube Goldberg traps for villains, which Scooby-Doo or Shaggy often set off by mistake, causing the villain to be captured in another way. Fred usually takes the lead in solving mysteries. When searching for clues, Fred and Daphne usually go together with Velma coming along, but sometimes Fred and Daphne pair off, leaving Velma to go with Shaggy and Scooby. Although generally a very nice guy, Fred can be bossy at times forcing Shaggy and Scooby to take part in nabbing the villain despite their fears and/or better judgment.

According to Scooby-Doo: Behind the Scenes, his boyhood nickname was "Pickle". He was voted "Best Looking" in school and was once part of a performance troupe before he devoted himself to solving mysteries. His drama training helps him get into the minds of the villains the gang faces. Daphne says that whenever they're feeling particularly scared, Fred would sing songs from Show Boat to soothe them. Fred one day hopes to be a famous mystery writer where he hopes to use all of his talents to the fullest.

In A Pup Named Scooby-Doo, Fred was depicted as being somewhat less intelligent and often believed crazy conspiracy theories and legends such as Bigfoot and mole people and read the magazine The National Exaggerator. In each episode, Fred would blame the crime on the neighborhood bully, Red Herring (a play on the idiom red herring). In What's New, Scooby-Doo?, the teenage version of Fred is shown to have many interests such as traps, martial arts, wrestling, and weightlifting. In Scooby-Doo: Mystery Incorporated, his interests are limited to "traps and solving mysteries," although later he admits he has feelings and dates Daphne.

Development

Fred Jones was inspired by the titular character of the late 1950s/early 1960s American sitcom The Many Loves of Dobie Gillis, as played by Dwayne Hickman. Some network sales presentation art from an early version of Scooby-Doo, entitled Who's S-S-Scared?, featured early designs of Fred with brown hair;

Originally named "Ronnie" when production for Scooby-Doo began in spring 1969, Fred was named by and after Fred Silverman, who was then head of daytime programming at CBS and a key member of the show's development team. Frank Welker, a young comedian and impressionist, was asked by the network to audition for the voice of Fred, although he had originally intended to audition for first Scooby-Doo (whom he eventually did get to voice after Don Messick died in 1997) and later Shaggy (Casey Kasem, who was cast as Shaggy, had originally wanted to voice Fred). Being cast as Fred led to the start of a long, prolific career in voice work for Welker, with Scooby-Doo being his first voice acting job.

Fred Jones has been given two different first names. In Scooby-Doo! Mystery Incorporated and Scooby-Doo! Haunted Holidays, he is called Frederick, while in Scooby-Doo! Adventures: The Mystery Map, he is called Fredward.

In a 2012 r/IAmA, Shaggy Rogers actor Matthew Lillard additionally revealed that the original cut of the 2002 Scooby-Doo film had Fred be revealed to be gay (which is why he always wore an ascot tie), and that Freddie Prinze Jr. had portrayed him as such throughout the film.

In the continuity of Scooby-Doo! Mystery Incorporated, it was revealed that Fred's father Fred Jones Sr. was not, in fact, his biological father, but instead, a man who kidnapped him as a child and raised him as his own son. His biological parents Brad Chiles and Judy Reeves later returned, but Fred continued to use the last name of Jones. In the series finale, when the universe is restarted to where Fred was never raised by Fred Jones Sr., but rather his biological parents, it is never stated what his last name is in a new reality. In Aloha, Scooby-Doo!, his middle name is stated to be Herman. While every member of the mystery gang is shown to have a catchphrase they use to express shock or surprise, Fred is the only member without one.

Performers

 Frank Welker (1969–present)
 Norma MacMillan (Kenner Talking Show Projector record)
 Keith Scott (Pauls commercial)
 Carl Steven (A Pup Named Scooby-Doo)
 Jerry Richardson (Scooby-Doo! in Stagefright - Live on Stage)
 Freddie Prinze Jr. (Scooby-Doo, Scooby-Doo 2: Monsters Unleashed (live-action), Robot Chicken (voice))
 Ryan Vrba (Young Fred in Scooby-Doo 2: Monsters Unleashed)
 Chris Cox (Scooby-Doo 2: Monsters Unleashed: The Video Game)
 Jamie Wilson (Scooby-Doo! and the Pirate Ghost - Live on Stage)
 Robbie Amell (Scooby-Doo! The Mystery Begins, Scooby-Doo! Curse of the Lake Monster)
 Kevin Shinick (Mad)
 Jim Wise (Scooby-Doo! Music of the Vampire (singing voice))
 Noah Michael Fish (Scooby-Doo Live! Musical Mysteries (2013))
 Josh Little (Scooby-Doo Live! The Mystery Of The Pyramid)
 Chris Warner Drake (Scooby-Doo Live! Musical Mysteries (2016))
 Scott Innes (McDonald's commercial, Scooby-Doo! Playmobil Mini Mysteries)
 Brett Dalton (Robot Chicken)
 Zac Efron (Scoob!)
 Pierce Gagnon (Scoob!, Scoob!: Holiday Haunt (both as a child))
 Glenn Howerton (Velma)

Relatives
Relatives of Fred's shown or mentioned during the series include:

 Mayor Fred Jones Sr.: Fred's illegal "father" in Scooby-Doo! Mystery Incorporated, voiced by Gary Cole. 
 Skip and Peggy Jones: Fred's father and mother in the film Scooby-Doo! Pirates Ahoy!. Voiced by Tim Conway and Edie McClurg.
 Brad Chiles and Judy Reeves: Fred's real father and mother in Scooby-Doo! Mystery Incorporated, voiced by Tim Matheson and Tia Carrere (younger selves voiced by Nolan North and Kari Wahlgren). 
 Eddie Jones: Fred's uncle from A Pup Named Scooby-Doo, voiced by Frank Welker. The publisher of the tabloid newspaper The National Exaggerator.
 The Count von Jones: Fred's uncle who lives in a castle near a factory that makes specialized coffins, and runs a Museum. 
 Uncle Karl: Fred's uncle who runs a cheese shop near Lake Michigan in Wisconsin. He appears in “Fright House of a Lighthouse." He is shown to be better than Fred at bench-pressing.
 An uncle who is in the United States Air Force and works for a space agency.
 An uncle who is first cymbalist in the United States Marine Corps band.
 A 3-year-old nephew. Mentioned in The New Scooby-Doo Movies episode that guest-starred The Monkees member Davy Jones, "The Haunted Horseman of Hagglethorn Hall".
 Arlene Wilcox: Fred's cousin living in Salem, Massachusetts, accused of being possessed by an ancestor burned at the stake for witchcraft. Voiced by Janet Waldo.
 Jed Jones: Fred's cousin working for Monstrous, Fright, and Magic. He is voiced by Chris Edgerly in Scooby-Doo! Unmasked.
 Donald Jones alias Professor Huh?: Fred's father in Be Cool, Scooby-Doo with an interesting backstory.
 Bobby Flay aka Uncle Bobby in Scooby-Doo! and the Gourmet Ghost.

References

Animated human characters
Child characters in animated films
Fictional amateur detectives
Fictional paranormal investigators
Male characters in animated films
Male characters in animated series
Male characters in animation
Male characters in film
Male characters in television
Scooby-Doo characters
Teenage characters in film
Teenage characters in television
Television characters introduced in 1969
Teenage characters in animated films